DeloPorts is a Russian stevedoring holding that consolidates the assets of Delo Group at the Novorossiysk Sea Port, comprising NUTEP container terminal, KSK grain terminal and Delo service company and towing operator. The primary beneficiary of DeloPorts is Russian businessman Sergey Shishkarev.

History
The company was registered in 2012 in the city of Limassol in Cyprus as a holding, consolidating assets of Delo Group at the Novorossiysk Sea Port. Initially, Sergey Shishkarev (owner of the Delo Group) had 90% of shares, while 10% belonged to his nephew Timofey Telyatnik, who also was one of the company's presidents. In 2015 the partnership dissolved due to the dissent in business strategies. Shishkarev purchased Telyatnik's share in June 2015 and became the sole owner of DeloPorts, transferring the group to Russian jurisdiction shortly afterwards.
At first DeloPorts holding comprised KSK grain terminal, NUTEP container terminal, TOS bunkering company (later renamed into "Delo Service Company") and NNK oil transshipment complex. In late 2013 100% of NNK were sold to Gazpromneft. Later in the same year, DeloPorts sold 25% share of KSK grain terminal to the Cargill food trader.

Structure
 KSK grain terminal is a third major Russian terminal in Black Sea Basin specializing in transferring grain cargoes. It started operating in 2006. As of the beginning of 2020, the total terminal area is 12,4 hectares, KSK handles transloading on 6 docks, 4 of which are company-owned and 2 are under long-term rent. Terminal's technical capabilities allow it to receive vessels like Supramax and Panamax (deadweight up to 55,000 tons). The KSK grain terminal has a direct access to state highway M4 "Don"state highway M4 "Don". As a result of modernisation, the terminal's capacity is expected to grow up to 220,000 tons, throughput capacity will increase up to 6,5 million tons. In 2018-2019 the construction of additional silos (102,000 tons in volume) was completed, as well as additional line of grain receivers from trains and trucks. Their own certified laboratory for grain quality control was expanded. Upon the completion of the dock №40a construction, the terminal will be able to receive type Post Panamax vessels (deadweight 100,000 tons).

NUTEP container terminal is the leading terminal in cargo transferring in Novorossiysk (its share is 48,8%) and the Azov and the Black Sea basin (its share is 48,1%) according to the report of 2019. It occupies 34 hectares, has its own railway park with 6 reception and departure sidings and possibility to create block-trains, as well as harbor railways and direct access to the major federal highway М4 'Don'. It can receive and dispatch containers via sea, railroad or on trucks, and serve vessels such as Panamax and Post-Panamax. In 2019 15m deep dock №38, began operating at NUTEP, being able to receive container ships up to 10 000 TEUs in capacity. The throughput capacity of the NUTEP terminal will increase to 700,000 TEU a year after the investment program is over in 2021.
 
Delo Service Operator operates 5 tugboats ASD Tug 2310, supplied by Damen Group from a Chinese shipyard. The sixth tugboat is scheduled to be delivered in 2021, it's expected to be named Delovoy-6, matching the rest of the tugboats. These vessels are used for towing, mooring and other logistic operations in DeloPorts' terminals in the Port of Novorossiysk.

Performance

DeloPorts' consolidated revenue in 2019 was 9,835 million roubles (-17,5% compared to 2018), the revenue from the container segment was 4,912 million roubles (+21% compared to 2018), the revenue from the grain segment was around 3,363 million (-44,1%). Consolidated EBITDA was 6,755 million roubles (-23,1%). Net profit was 4,863 million roubles (-20,4%), net liabilities were 22,126 million (+14,4%). Total cargo turnover in 2019 was 8,3 million tons (-4,6% compared to 2018).
DeloPorts accrues to the major share of Delo Group cash flow. For instance, in December 2017 — April 2018 Delo Group issued an offering of bonds for $140 mln and raised borrowings for DeloPorts to acquire 30.75% share of Global Ports' stevedoring company.

In October 2019, Expert RA agency affirmed the ruA+ credit rating with a stable outlook for DeloPorts.

From April 2018, the long term B+ corporate credit rating is valid. It was given to DeloPorts by Standard & Poor's.
In May 2020 S&P Global Ratings international rating agency reaffirms long term B+ credit ratings in foreign and national currency with a stable outlook and put "DeloPorts" away from the CreditWatch list.

In March 2019, Fitch confirmed BB- long term rating with a stable outlook.

References

External links
 

Ports and harbours of Russia
Ports and harbours of the Black Sea
Port operating companies
Companies based in Novorossiysk